This is a partial list of books for which American artist and illustrator John Jude Palencar was the cover artist or illustrated the cover and interior pages.

Bibliography

Illustrated books 
Books illustrated by the artist, both cover art and interior
The Secret, by Byron Preiss, Bantam Books, 1982

Stories of five decades / Hermann Hesse,  edited by Theodore Ziolkowski, Franklin Library, 1984

Restless Dead : More Strange Real-Life Mysteries by Jim Razzi, HarperTrophy, 1994

Nightmare Island: and Other Real-Life Mysteries  by Jim Razzi, Harper Collins, 1993

As cover artist 
Books for which the artist created the cover art

Star Rider by Doris Piserchia (1983)

The Ghost Light by Fritz Leiber (1984)

Teot's War by Heather Gladney (1986)
The Postman by David Brin (1986)

Lord of the Crooked Paths by David H. Adkins (1987)
Chthon by Piers Anthony (1987)

The Serpent's Egg by Caroline Stevermer(1988)

Master of the Fearful Depths by David H. Adkins(1989)
Blood Storm by Heather Gladney (1989)

Blake House by Adrian Savage (1990)
The Devil's Advocate by Andrew Neiderman (1990)
Scorpio by Alex McDonough (1990)
Scorpio Rising by Alex McDonough (1990)

Tehanu by Ursula K. Le Guin(1991)
Scorpio Descending by Alex McDonough (1991)
Blood Price by Tanya Huff (1991)
Blood Trail by Tanya Huff (1991)

The Hollow Man by Dan Simmons (1992)
Apparition by Graham Masterton (1992)

Impossible Things (1993)
Blood Pact by Tanya Huff (1993)
Blood Lines by Tanya Huff (1993)
The Wall at the Edge of the World, by Jim Aikin (1993)
The Innkeeper's Song by Peter S. Beagle (1993)

The Forest House by Marion Zimmer Bradley (1994)
Impossible Things by Connie Willis (1994)
The Children of Men by P.D. James (1994)
Rhinegold by Stephan Grundy (1994)
Dead Morn by Piers Anthony, Roberto Fuentes (1994)
The Hollowing by Robert Holdstock (1994)
Mind of My Mind by Octavia E. Butler (1994)
LoveDeath by Dan Simmons (1994)
Personal Darkness by Tanith Lee (1994)
Earthsong by Suzette Haden Elgin (1994)

Evolution's Shore by Ian McDonald (1995)
Parable of the Sower by Octavia E. Butler (1995)
Patternmaster by Octavia E. Butler (1995)
Dreams of Terror and Death: The Dream Cycle of H.P. Lovecraft (1995)
Testament by Valerie J. Freireich (1995)
Sisters of the Night anthology by Martin H. Greenberg and Barbara Hambly (1995)
Becoming Human by Valerie J. Freireich (1995)
All the Bells on Earth by James P. Blaylock (1995)

The Transition of H. P. Lovecraft: The Road to Madness by H.P. Lovecraft(1996)
Return to Avalon by Jennifer Roberson (1996)
Attila's Treasure by Stephan Grundy (1996)
Archangel by Sharon Shinn (1996)
Clay's Ark by Octavia E. Butler (1996)

Lady of Avalon (1997)
Jovah's Angel by Sharon Shinn (1997)
Blood Debt by Tanya Huff (1997)
Adulthood Rites by Octavia E. Butler (1997)
Dawn by Octavia E. Butler (1997)
Imago by Octavia E. Butler (1997)
The Regulators by Richard Bachman (1997)
The White Tribunal by Paula Volsky (1997)
Desperation by Stephen King (1997)
The Dark Tower paperback editions by Stephen King (1997)
The Drawing of the Three
The Waste Lands
Wizard and Glass

The Alleluia Files by Sharon Shinn (1998)
Tales of the Cthulhu Mythos anthology by August Derleth (1998)
Fire Watch by Connie Willis (1998)
Of Saints and Shadows by Christopher Golden (1998)
The Arm of the Stone by Victoria Strauss (1998)

Graven Images: Three Stories, by Paul Fleischman (1999)
The Terrorists of Irustan by Louise Marley (1999)
The Wild Swans by Peg Kerr (1999)
Wild Seed by Octavia E. Butler (1999)

Forests of the Heart by Charles de Lint (2000)
Daughter of the Forest by Juliet Marillier  (2000)
Liar Liar by R.L. Stine (2000)
Locker 13 by R.L. Stine (2000)
The Redemption of Althalus by David Eddings and Leigh Eddings (2000)

The Onion Girl by Charles de Lint (2001)
The Bone Doll's Twin by Lynn Flewelling (2001)
Kushiel's Dart by Jacqueline Carey (2001)
Empty Cities of the Full Moon by Howard V. Hendrix (2001)
Child of the Prophecy by Juliet Marillier (2001)
Son of the Shadows by Juliet Marillier (2001)
Shadows over Innsmouth anthology by  Stephen Jones
Parable of the Talents by  Octavia E. Butler (2001)

Kushiel's Chosen by Jacqueline Carey (2002)
A Scattering of Jades by Alexander C. Irvine (2002)
The Eye of Night by Pauline J. Alama
Waifs and Strays by Charles de Lint (2002)
Tales of the Lovecraft Mythos anthology by Robert M. Price (2002)

Kushiel's Avatar by Jacqueline Carey (2003)
Angelica by Sharon Shinn (2003)
Hidden Warrior by Lynn Flewelling (2003)
Dreams Underfoot by Charles de Lint
Eragon by Christopher Paolini (2003)
Spirits in the Wires by Charles de Lint (2003)
Confidence Game by Michelle M. Welch
Shadows Over Baker Street anthology by John Pelan and Michael Reaves (2003)
Eye of Flame by Pamela Sargent (2003)

Angel-Seeker by Sharon Shinn (2004)
Smoke and Shadows by Tanya Huff (2004)
The New Lovecraft Circle anthology by Robert M. Price (2004)
The Child Goddess by Louise Marley (2004)
The Wild Reel by Paul Brandon (2004)
The Bright and The Dark by Michelle M. Welch (2004)
This Immortal by Roger Zelazny (2004)

Trader by Charles de Lint (2005)
Smoke and Mirrors by Tanya Huff (2005)
A Princess of Roumania by Paul Park (2005)
Someplace to Be Flying by Charles de Lint (2005)
Eldest by Christopher Paolini (2005)
Chasing Fire by Michelle M. Welch (2005)
Four and Twenty Blackbirds by Cherie Priest (2005)

The Lord of the Rings (2005)
The Fellowship of the Ring (2005) 
The Two Towers (2005)
The Return of the King

Moonlight and Vines by Charles de Lint (2006)
Widdershins by Charles de Lint (2006)
Kushiel's Scion by Jacqueline Carey (2006)
Smoke and Ashes by Tanya Huff (2006)
The Greener Shore by Morgan Llywelyn (2006)
The Oracle's Queen by Lynn Flewelling (2006)
The Blood Books, Volume 1 by Tanya Huff (2006)
The Blood Books, Volume 2 by Tanya Huff (2006)
The Black Tattoo by Sam Enthoven (2006)
Path of Destruction by Drew Karpyshyn (2006)
The Tourmaline by Paul Park (2006)
 Wings To The Kingdom by Cherie Priest (2006)
Brisingr by Christopher Paolini (2006)

The White Tyger by Paul Park (2007)
Wizards: Magical Tales from the Masters of Modern Fantasy anthology by Jack Dann and Gardner Dozois (2007)
Territory by Emma Bull (2007)
The Winds of Marble Arch and Other Stories by Connie Willis (2007)
The Horror in the Museum  by H. P. Lovecraft (2007)
Not Flesh Nor Feathers by Cherie Priest (2007)
Fatal Revenant by Stephen R. Donaldson (2007)

Feast of Souls by C. S. Friedman (2008)
The Hidden World by Paul Park (2008)
The Watchers Out of Time by August Derleth and H. P. Lovecraft (2008)

Heir to Sevenwaters by Juliet Marillier (2009)
Steal Across the Sky by Nancy Kress (2009)
Wings of Wrath by C. S. Friedman (2009)
The Mystery of Grace by Charles de Lint (2009)
The Dragon Book anthology by Jack Dann and Gardner Dozois (2009)
Dynasty of Evil by Drew Karpyshyn (2009)
Black Ships by Jo Graham (2009)
Muse and Reverie by Charles de Lint (2009)

Hand of Isis by Jo Graham (2010)
Bitter Seeds by Ian Tregillis (2010)
Stealing Fire by Jo Graham (2010)
Against All Things Ending by Stephen R. Donaldson (2010)
Seer of Sevenwaters by Juliet Marillier (2010)
The Horrid Glory of Its Wings by Elizabeth Bear (2010)

Lee at the Alamo by Harry Turtledove (2011)
Inheritance by Christopher Paolini (2011)
Broken Blade by Kelly McCullough (2011)

Our Human by Adam-Troy Castro (2012)
Bared Blade by Kelly McCullough (2012)
Legacy of Kings by C. S. Friedman (2012)
Flame of Sevenwaters by Juliet Marillier (2012)
Crossed Blades by Kelly McCullough (2012)
Daughter of Regals & Other Tales by Stephen R. Donaldson (2012)

Rag and Bone, by Priya Sharma, Tor Books (2013)
Blade Reforged by Kelly McCullough (2013)
A Terror by Jeffrey Ford (2013)
Blades in Shadow by Kelly McCullough (2013)
The Last Dark by Stephen R. Donaldson (2013)
Weird Shadows Over Innsmouth anthology by Stephen Jones (2013)
Incarnations of Immortality by Piers Anthony (2013)
The One-Eyed Man by L. E. Modesitt Jr. (2013)

Reave the Just and Other Tales by Stephen R. Donaldson (2014)
Drawn Blades by Kelly McCullough (2014)

Weirder Shadows Over Innsmouth, anthology by  Stephen Jones (2015)
The Thyme Fiend by Jeffrey Ford (2015)
Darkened Blade by Kelly McCullough (2015)
The Runes of Earth by Stephen R. Donaldson (2015)
Silver on the Road by Laura Anne Gilman (2015)
The King's Justice: Two Novellas by Stephen R. Donaldson (2015)
The Log Goblin by Brian Staveley (2015)

That Game We Played During the War by Carrie Vaughn (2016)

The Cold Eye by Laura Anne Gilman (2017)
Winter Tide by Ruthanna Emrys (2017)

Deep Roots by Ruthanna Emrys (2018)
The Fork, the Witch, and the Worm by Christopher Paolini (2018)

Severed Wings by Steven-Elliot Altman (2020)

References

Book covers by artist
Books by cover artist